Joseph T. Parisi is an American politician, from Madison, Wisconsin. Parisi currently serves as Dane County Executive, having taken office on April 18, 2011, and being re-elected in 2013 after running unopposed. A Democrat, Parisi served as a member of the Wisconsin State Assembly from 2005 until 2011.

Background 
Parisi was born in Madison, Wisconsin on October 24, 1960. He attended Middleton High School and Madison Area Technical College before earning a B.A. in sociology from the University of Wisconsin-Madison. He was also a drummer for the blues-rock band Honor Among Thieves.

He was elected as Dane County county clerk in the 1996 election, and served in that office until running for the Assembly in 2004.

Legislative service 
In 2004 Parisi was elected to represent Wisconsin's 48th Assembly district.  The district encompasses McFarland, Monona, the Towns of Blooming Grove and Dunn and the far eastern portion of the City of Madison. Land-use in the district ranges from high-intensity urban and heavy industrial to natural areas as well as several miles of Lake Monona shoreline. Parisi won his primary by over 2:1, and in the general election defeated Dan Long (Republican) by 25,066 to 8451. He was assigned to the standing committees on aging and long-term care, on agriculture, on budget review, on corrections and the courts, and on local and urban affairs.

In 2006, he again faced Long in the general election, and defeated him by a fractionally larger margin. In 2008, he was unopposed in both the primary and general elections. In 2010, he defeated Spencer Zimmerman (Republican) and Grant Gilbertson (independent running as a "Progress-Freedom" candidate), with 20,650 for Parisi, 6929 for Zimmerman, and 893 for Gilbertson.
His work in the State Assembly focused on criminal justice, ending domestic abuse and sexual assault and workforce development. In 2014 he testified in favor of a living wage before a Senate committee that had fast-tracked legislation against it.

On April 14, 2011, after having been elected Dane County Executive, Parisi resigned from the Wisconsin State Assembly. He was succeeded by Chris Taylor, who was unopposed in the general election after winning a six-way Democratic primary election.

Dane County Executive 
On April 5, 2011, Parisi was elected Dane County Executive with 70.1% of the vote, defeating Eileen Bruskewitz, who garnered 29.8%. He began his two-year term on April 18. Parisi succeeded Kathleen Falk who retired in the middle of her fourth four-year term.

Parisi was elected to a full four-year term on April 2, 2013, with no candidates opposing him.

He was re-elected to County Executive on April 4, 2017 with 98.9% of the vote and no opposing candidates.

Parisi was re-elected to a third full term on April 6, 2021, defeating Mary Ann Nicholson, an accountant who suspended her campaign after her husband's death but remained on the ballot. Parisi received 78.9% of the vote to Nicholson's 20.9%.

Notes

External links
 http://www.thedailypage.com/isthmus/article.php?article=42741
 http://capitalcityhues.com/112813JoeParisi.html
Green Fleet Magazine Dane County's BioCNG Fueling Station Turns Trash Into Gas: http://www.greenfleetmagazine.com/news/51693/dane-countys-biocng-fueling-station-turns-trash-into-gas
 http://progressive.org/wis-republicans-want-to-crush-living-wage
 
 Follow the Money – Joseph T Parisi
2008 2006 2004 campaign contributions
Campaign 2008 campaign contributions at Wisconsin Democracy Campaign
Campaign website

1960 births
Dane County Executives
Living people
Democratic Party members of the Wisconsin State Assembly
Madison Area Technical College alumni
University of Wisconsin–Madison College of Letters and Science alumni
21st-century American politicians